Jean-Baptiste-Henri Deshays or Deshayes (1729 – 10 February 1765) was a French painter of religious and mythological subjects.

Life 
Deshays was born in Colleville, near Rouen.  His first training was under his father, the minor Rouen painter Jean-Dominique Deshays, he then spent a little time under Jean-Baptiste Descamps at his Ecole Gratuite de Dessin.  He spent time in Hyacinthe Collin de Vermont's Paris studio from around 1740 to 1749 and Jean Restout II's from late 1749 to 1751.  Both these had been pupils of Jean Jouvenet, and painted in the Grand Style of French history painting, a style Deshays adopted as his own.

While he was in Restout's studio, Deshays entered the Prix de Rome competition, winning second prize in 1750 with 
His 1750 Laban Giving his Daughter in Marriage to Jacob won the second prize in the Grand Prix de Rome, and his 1751 Job on the Dung-hill the first prize.  Deshays served the compulsory three years training at the Ecole des Eleves Protégés (where he learnt from Carle van Loo, its director, and attracted some religious commissions, including two vast canvases, a Visitation and an Annunciation, for the monastery of the Visitation at Rouen), before going to Rome.  He then spent 4 years under Charles-Joseph Natoire at the French Academy in Rome, making several copies of works by Raphael, Domenichino, Guercino and the Carracci.  On Deshays' return to Paris in 1758, he married Boucher's elder daughter, and a year later became a full academician, though he only exhibited at 4 official Salons.  He died in Paris.

References

External links

 Biography of Deshays on World Gallery of Art

1729 births
1765 deaths
18th-century French painters
French male painters
18th-century French male artists